Dara (also Δάρας - Daras) is a community in the municipal unit of Levidi, northern Arcadia, Greece. It is situated on a mountain slope near the border with Achaea. It is 2 km southeast of Pankrati (Achaea), 5 km northeast of Prasino, 16 km north of Vytina and 16 km northeast of Levidi. The Greek National Road 33 (Patras - Levidi) passes south of the village. Dara has a historical folklore museum displaying the woodcarvings of Giannis Bakopoulos.

Historical population

External links 
Dara, Arcadia
Arcadia - Dara 
GTP - Daras

See also
List of settlements in Arcadia

References

Populated places in Arcadia, Peloponnese